Yashraj Kapil is an Indian singer from Faridabad. He is the winner of the reality show Sitaron Ko Choona Hai, and also participated in the music reality shows Sur kshetra and Indian Idol 5.

Biography 
Yashraj is originally from Faridabad and is currently living in Mumbai. He started learning Hindustani classical music from the age of 4. His parents left Faridabad and shifted to Delhi just to support his music. Has taken part in many reality shows and done well in all of them. His wish is to be a performer not just a singer. Yashraj is a prodigy and can play the keyboard and guitar in spite of not taking any lessons in them. Eighteen-year-old Yashraj Kapil was a winner of a reality show on television. Even though he emerged victorious and gained recognition, his career came to a standstill and he continued to struggle to get due credit for his talent in the music industry. Being the only child of his parents, he has received a lot of love and attention from them. They have also been his constant support. Yashraj's favourite playback singers include Sonu Nigam, KK, Shankar Mahadevan, Nusrat and Rahat Fateh Ali Khan. He makes a comeback into showbiz through Indian Idol 5 as he feels he fulfils each and every criterion to be India singing sensation be it talent, faith, confidence, style and a good voice.

Reality shows

Filmography

References 

Year of birth missing (living people)
Living people
Bollywood playback singers
Indian male playback singers